How Does It Feel may refer to:

Music

Albums
 How Does It Feel, a 1999 album by Nancy Sinatra
 How Does It Feel (album) by MS MR

Songs
 "How Does It Feel" (Anita Baker song)
 "How Does It Feel" (Slade song)
 "How Does It Feel (to be the mother of 1000 dead)?", a controversial song by Crass
 "How Does It Feel", a song by Avril Lavigne from Under My Skin
 "How Does It Feel", a song by Candlebox from Into the Sun
 "How Does It Feel", a song by Keri Hilson from In a Perfect World...
 "How Does It Feel", a song by London Grammar from Californian Soil
 "How Does It Feel", a song by Men Without Hats from No Hats Beyond This Point
 "How Does It Feel", a song by M-22
 "How Does It Feel?", a song by Pharrell Williams from In My Mind
 "How Does It Feel?", a song by The Ronettes from Presenting the Fabulous Ronettes Featuring Veronica
 "How Does It Feel", a song by Toto from Isolation
 "How Does It Feel", a song by Westlife from Unbreakable – The Greatest Hits Vol. 1
 "Untitled (How Does It Feel)", a song by D'Angelo from Voodoo
 "Like a Rolling Stone", song by Bob Dylan from Highway 61 Revisited, best known for the line "How does it feel?"
 "Blue Monday" (New Order song), a song whose first line is "How does it feel"